Manindra Ray (4 October 1919 – 28 August 2000) was an Indian Bengali poet and editor.

Career
Ray was born in Sitlai village in Pabna District in British India. His parents are Shachandra Ray and Subhasini Devi. Ray studied in Surendranath College, Kolkata and attracted to communism. His first book of poems Trishanku was published in 1939. Ray edited number of little magazine. He was awarded Sahitya Akademi Award for his poetry 'Mohini Aral' in 1969. In 1993, he was awarded the Rabindra Puraskar for his book 'Sonnet Samagra'. Ray was the co-editor of a Weekly literary magazine Amrita.

See also  
 List of Sahitya Akademi Award winners for Bengali

References 

1919 births
2000 deaths
Bengali Hindus
Bengali writers
Bengali poets
Bengali male poets
20th-century Bengali poets
Indian poets
Indian male poets
Indian male writers
Indian editors
Indian magazine editors
20th-century Indian writers
20th-century Indian male writers
20th-century Indian poets
Recipients of the Sahitya Akademi Award in Bengali
Recipients of the Rabindra Puraskar
People from Pabna District
Writers from Kolkata
Surendranath College alumni